Carl Swensson may refer to:

 Carl Aaron Swensson (1857–1904), American Lutheran minister and founder and president of Bethany College
 Carl Gustav Swensson (1861–1910), Swedish landscape architect